The Russian Cup 1993–94 was the second season of the Russian football knockout tournament since the dissolution of Soviet Union.

Russian Premier League team FC Luch Vladivostok did not participate.

First round

18 April 1993.

2 May 1993.

Second round

7 May 1993.

8 May 1993.

23 May 1993.

Third round

Russian Premier League team FC KAMAZ Naberezhnye Chelny started at this stage.

28 May 1993.

14 June 1993.

16 June 1993.

28 June 1993.

Round of 32

All the other Russian Premier League teams started at this stage.

Round of 16

Quarter-finals

Semi-finals

Final

Played in the earlier stages, but were not on the final game squad:

FC Spartak Moscow: Dimitri Ananko (DF), Andrei Ivanov (DF), Valery Kechinov (MF), Nikolai Pisarev (FW), Dmitri Radchenko (FW), Sergey Rodionov (FW), Fyodor Cherenkov (FW).

PFC CSKA Moscow: Yervand Krbachyan (DF), Oleg Malyukov (DF), Sergei Mamchur (DF), Sergei Kolotovkin (DF), Dmitri Shoukov (MF), Dmitri Karsakov (MF), Yuri Bavykin (MF), Yuri Dudnyk (MF), Leonid Markevich (MF), Dmitri Khokhlov (MF), Oleg Sergeyev (FW), Aleksei Bychkov (FW), Valeri Masalitin (FW, played for Spartak in the final).

References

Russian Cup seasons
Russian Cup
Cup
Cup